Kodimoottil Sri Bhadrakaali Temple is the most famous temple in Parippally, Kollam. The "Prathista" (idol) in this temple is Bhadrakali devi. Shiva, Ganapathi, Navagrahangal  are also there as Upaprathista.

There are a number of utsavams in this temple. The mahotsavam is held every year during the month of March for ten days, starting with the pongala. Ladies from all parts of Kollam and Trivandrum districts participate in it. Gajamela, an elephant procession, is the main attraction of the Mahotsavam, which occurs on the tenth day.

The temple is managed by Ezhava (Chekaver) community, but people from all castes participate in the festival. Navarathri is also celebrated here as a festival.

See also
 Temples of Kerala

References

Keralathile maha kshethrangaliloode: K.Narayanan kutty
Kodimoottiltemple Official Website

External links

Temple profile at enchantingkerala.org
Video of the gajamela

Hindu temples in Kollam district
Durga temples
Devi temples in Kerala